The Special Roads Act 1949 (c.32) was an Act of the Parliament of the United Kingdom that:
Authorised the construction of special roads (that became known as motorways)
Allowed these roads to be restricted to specific types of vehicles

The Special Roads Act was repealed and replaced by the Highways Act 1959, and later the Highways Act 1980.  This act did not apply to Northern Ireland.

External links
 

United Kingdom Acts of Parliament 1949
Roads in the United Kingdom
1949 in transport
Motorways in the United Kingdom
Repealed United Kingdom Acts of Parliament
Transport policy in the United Kingdom
History of transport in the United Kingdom
Transport legislation